In the 1994–95 San Jose Sharks season, the Sharks once again qualified for the playoffs and won their first-round series against the Calgary Flames before losing in the second round to the Detroit Red Wings.

Offseason
The Sharks chose Jeff Friesen with their first-round pick, eleventh overall. Friesen would play for the Sharks for nearly seven seasons.

Regular season
The Sharks started their lockout-shortened season by winning 5 of their first 6 games. In their first win of the season on January 21, 1995, 18-year-old rookie Jeff Friesen scored his very first National Hockey League goal, a short-handed game-winner against the Toronto Maple Leafs as the Sharks won 3-2. Their streak soon came to an end, and the team lost 5 straight from February 18 to 26. Although he had 4 shutouts, goaltender Artūrs Irbe struggled, going 14-19-3 with a goals against average (GAA) of 3.26 and a save percentage (SV%) of .895. Friesen went on to lead the Sharks in goals with 15. During the season, the team acquired forwards Craig Janney and Kevin Miller in a trade with the St. Louis Blues for forward Todd Elik and defenseman Jeff Norton. Captain Bob Errey is traded to the Detroit Red Wings, and forward Jeff Odgers is named team captain.

The Sharks finished last in shots on goal (1,152) during the regular season.

Season standings

Schedule and results

Playoffs
In the first round of playoffs, the Sharks once again upset the team with the better record, as they edged the Calgary Flames 4 games to 3. The Sharks allowed 5 shorthanded goals and gave up 35 total goals in the series. In the second round, the Sharks faced the Detroit Red Wings, whom they had defeated in 7 games in the first round of the 1994 Stanley Cup Playoffs. This time around, it was no contest, as Detroit blanked San Jose 6-0 in game 1, and won games 2, 3 and 4 by identical scores of 6-2. Detroit forward Vyacheslav Kozlov scored 4 goals and had 5 assists for 9 points in the 4 games. The Red Wings' special teams dominated the Sharks, scoring 7 power-play goals and adding two shorthanded goals. The Sharks were outscored 24-6 in the series, and were outshot 147-61.

Player statistics

Note: Pos = Position; GP = Games played; G = Goals; A = Assists; Pts = Points; +/- = plus/minus; PIM = Penalty minutes; PPG = Power-play goals; SHG = Short-handed goals; GWG = Game-winning goals
      MIN = Minutes played; W = Wins; L = Losses; T = Ties; GA = Goals-against; GAA = Goals-against average; SO = Shutouts; SA = Shots against; SV = Shots saved; SV% = Save percentage;

Transactions

Trade Deadline Transactions

Draft picks

References
 Sharks on Hockey Database

S
S
San Jose Sharks seasons
San Jose Sharks
San Jose Sharks